Eshott Airfield is a former Royal Air Force (RAF) World War II airfield in the civil parish of Thirston, in the county of Northumberland, England,  north of Newcastle, and midway between Morpeth and Alnwick. It is also known as Bockenfield Aerodrome.

Second World War
From 10 November 1942 during the Second World War it was home to No. 57 Operational Training Unit RAF. Training on Supermarine Spitfires was carried out there until the unit was transferred north to RAF Boulmer in August 1944.

Modern use
Eshott is now used by recreational microlights and small light aircraft. It has both tarmac and grass runways.

The airfield is now the home of over 40 aircraft and has a clubhouse building, parking, and three hangar blocks.

References

External links
 Official website

Airports in North East England
Buildings and structures in Northumberland